At least three ships of the Pakistan Navy have been named Moawin:

, a  launched as USS Hector in 1942 she was transferred to Pakistan and renamed in 1989. She was returned to the United States in 1994 and scrapped.
, a replenishment ship launched as HNLMS Poolster in 1963 she was transferred to Pakistan and renamed in 1994. 
, a replenishment oiler launched in 2016

Pakistan Navy ship names